James Henry (born 24 October 1962) is justice of the Supreme Court of Queensland in the Trial Division. He has served on the court since 2011, and became Senior Counsel in 2006. He is also a graduate of the University of Queensland school of law.

References

Judges of the Supreme Court of Queensland
Living people
1962 births
Place of birth missing (living people)